Coup d'Etat + One of a Kind & Heartbreaker (stylized as COUP D’ETAT [+ ONE OF A KIND & HEARTBREAKER]) is the first Japanese compilation album by South Korean artist G-Dragon, member of the K-pop group Big Bang. The album was released on November 27, 2013, and is a compilation of his studio discography from 2009, containing the recently released Coup d'Etat, as well as One of a Kind, and Heartbreaker. It was released in multiple editions ranging from regular CD, DVD, and Playbutton.

The album features collaborations from various artists such as Missy Elliott, Sky Ferreira, Zion.T, Lydia Paek, Park Bom of 2NE1, and Rosé and Jennie Kim from Blackpink.

Release
The album was released in three editions. All editions come with a serial access code to view rehearsal footage from Big Bang's Japan Dome Tour. The first press limited edition includes two CDs, DVD, photo book, and a sports towel. The DVD contains eleven music videos and the making of the "Who You?" music video. The Playbutton edition contains only the Coup d'Etat album on a playbutton MP3 player.

Track listing

Disc 1

Disc 2

DVD

 Samples
"Coup d'Etat" contains a vocal sample of "The Revolution Will Not Be Televised" performed by Gil Scott-Heron.
"Niliria" contains elements of a traditional Korean folk song of the same name.

Certifications

References

External links
 

2013 albums
YG Entertainment albums
G-Dragon albums
Albums produced by G-Dragon
Albums produced by Teddy Park